Marianne Sivertsen Næss (born 28 March 1974) is a Norwegian politician.

She was elected representative to the Storting from the constituency of Finnmark for the period 2021–2025, for the Labour Party.

References

1974 births
Living people
Labour Party (Norway) politicians
Finnmark politicians
Members of the Storting
Women members of the Storting